Levi Shinn House is a historic home located at Shinnston, Harrison County, West Virginia.  It is a log dwelling built in 1778, and measuring 37 feet long and 20 feet deep.  It features a large interior chimney, providing fireplaces for several of the interior rooms.  It is the oldest standing house in north central West Virginia. It was acquired in 1972 by the Shinnston Historical Association and is sometimes open to the public.

The house was the residence of Levi Shinn, the namesake of Shinnston. It was listed on the National Register of Historic Places in 1973.

References

External links
West Virginia Division of Culture and History: Life in the Levi Shinn House

Houses on the National Register of Historic Places in West Virginia
Houses completed in 1778
Houses in Harrison County, West Virginia
National Register of Historic Places in Harrison County, West Virginia